Hedon Racecourse railway station is a disused railway station on the North Eastern Railway's Hull and Holderness Railway to the west of Hedon in the East Riding of Yorkshire, England. It was opened by the North Eastern Railway on 24 August 1888 to serve the newly opened Hedon Park Racecourse. The station was not timetabled and only operated on race days. The station was closed in 1909 when horse racing was terminated. The station was briefly re-opened as Hedon Halt between 14 August 1948 and 23 October 1948 to serve speedway meetings.

References

 
 

Railway stations in Great Britain opened in 1888
Railway stations in Great Britain closed in 1909
Disused railway stations in the East Riding of Yorkshire
Railway stations in Great Britain opened in 1948
Railway stations in Great Britain closed in 1948
Former North Eastern Railway (UK) stations
Hull and Holderness Railway